"Guadalajara" is a well-known mariachi song written and composed by Pepe Guízar in 1937. Guízar wrote the song in honor of his hometown, the city of the same name and state capital of the Mexican state of Jalisco.

Versions 
The song was first popularized by Lucha Reyes, a Mexican singer who was born in Guadalajara and is often regarded as the "mother of ranchera music".

In the 1940s, Mexican singer Irma Vila recorded the song and sang it in the musical film Canta y no llores... (1949). Her rendition was later remastered and released in the compilation album Irma Vila, La Reina del Falsete: Todos sus éxitos.

In 1950, Mexican singer Flor Silvestre recorded the song for Columbia Records; her version also became a success and was included in several compilation albums, including Canciones mexicanas, vol. 1, Fandango ranchero, and Flor Silvestre canta sus éxitos (1964).

Demetrio González, a Spanish-born singer of Mexican music, performed the song in the film Los cinco halcones (1962).

One of the most popular interpretations outside of Mexico was that of Elvis Presley in the final scene of the film Fun in Acapulco (1963). Other notable non-Mexican interpreters of this song were Nat King Cole on his album More Cole Español (1962), Percy Faith on Viva the Music of Mexico (1958), and Desi Arnaz on The Best of Desi Arnaz Mambo King. Among the notable Mexican interpreters are to mention Rafael Jorge Negrete, Esquivel and His Orchestra and Vicente Fernández.

Lyrics 
The entire lyrics are published below. Many performers omit some of the verses. For example, Pedro Infante only sung the first two verses.

References

External links
 Information about the song at GuadalajaraGuadalajara.com

1937 songs
Mariachi
Spanish-language songs
Flor Silvestre songs